Rudolf Lange (18 April 1910 –  23 February 1945) was a German SS functionary and police official during the Nazi era. With the invasion of the Soviet Union, he served in Einsatzgruppe A before becoming a commander in the Sicherheitsdienst (SD) and all RSHA personnel in Riga, Latvia. He participated in the January 1942 Wannsee Conference, at which the genocidal Final Solution to the Jewish Question was planned, and was largely responsible for implementing the murder of Latvia's Jewish population during the Holocaust.

Early life and career 
Lange was born in Weißwasser, Prussian Silesia, a town in present-day Saxony. His father was a railway construction supervisor. Lange finished high school in Staßfurt in 1928 and studied law in the University of Jena. He received a doctorate in law in 1933, and was recruited by the Gestapo office of Halle. He joined the Sturmabteilung (SA) in November 1933, but soon felt that this had been a bad career move. Thus, in 1936 Lange joined the Schutzstaffel (SS) (member number 290,308).

As a mid-level Gestapo official, Lange rose rapidly. He adopted the SS ideology wholeheartedly, and resigned from the church in 1937. From 1936 he worked in the Gestapo office in Berlin. In May 1938, Lange was transferred to Vienna to supervise the annexation of the Austrian police system. There, he met and worked with Franz Walter Stahlecker, who later became his superior in Riga. In June 1939 Lange was transferred to Stuttgart.

In September 1939 the security and police agencies of Nazi Germany (with the exception of the Orpo) were consolidated into the Reich Security Main Office (RSHA) of the SS, headed by Reinhard Heydrich. The Gestapo became Amt IV (Department IV) of the RSHA and Heinrich Müller became the Gestapo Chief, with Heydrich as his immediate superior. From May to July 1940, Lange ran the Gestapo offices of Weimar and Erfurt, while working as the deputy head of the office of the Inspector of the SiPo in Kassel. In September 1940, Lange was promoted as the deputy head of police for Berlin. In April 1941, he was promoted to SS-Sturmbannführer (major).

Mass murder in Latvia 

On 5 June 1941 Lange was ordered to Pretzsch and the command staff of Einsatzgruppe A, headed by SS-Brigadeführer und Generalmajor der Polizei Dr. Franz Walter Stahlecker.

Lange was a Teilkommando (detachment) leader in Einsatzkommando 2, or EK2. He was one of the few people aware of the Führerbefehl or "fundamental orders" for the so-called "Jewish problem" in Latvia. According to Lange himself:
From the very beginning, the goal of EK2 was that radical solution of the Jewish problem by killing all Jews.

On 3 December 1941, he was promoted as commander of EK2, replacing Eduard Strauch. Lange was also the area chief of the Sicherheitsdienst (SD), the Nazi Security Service, with the title Kommandant des Sicherheitsdienst. He was in charge of Department IV of the SD in Latvia. The department was the "hub of the whole SD organization in Latvia, the other departments served it." Matters of formal rank and titles were never clear in the Nazi occupation regime for Latvia, as the lines of authority within agencies and the relationship between one agency and others were "ambiguous, overlapping, and unclear". Nevertheless, Lange is widely recognized as one of the primary perpetrators of the Holocaust in Latvia.

His headquarters were in Riga, on Reimersa Street. From the beginning of his involvement in Latvia, Lange gave orders to squads of Latvians, such as the Arajs Kommando, that the Germans had organised to carry out massacres in the smaller cities. According to one historian, Viktors Arājs was "held on a short leash" by Lange. Another local organisation receiving orders from Lange was the Vagulāns Kommando, which was responsible for the Jelgava massacres in July and August 1941.

Lange also personally supervised executions conducted by the Arājs commando. He appears to have ordered that all the SD officers should personally participate in the killings.

Lange was responsible for the Latvian part of the decision by the Nazi regime to deport Jews from Germany, Austria and Czechoslovakia to Riga. In this connection, on 8 November 1941, he issued detailed orders to Hinrich Lohse, who was Reichskommissar Ostland, regarding the transport of 50,000 Jews to the East, with 25,000 going to Riga and 25,000 to Belarus. At the same time, Lange was organising the construction of the Salaspils concentration camp, originally intended to accommodate these deportees. Because the Salaspils camp would not be ready by the time the Jews would arrive, Lange decided to send the transports to an abandoned estate near Riga called Jungfernhof or Jumpravmuiza, which would be set up as Jungfernhof concentration camp.

In November 1941 Lange was involved in the planning and carrying out the murder of 24,000 Latvian Jews from the Riga ghetto which occurred on 30 November and 8 December 1941. This crime has come to be known as the Rumbula massacre. In addition to the Latvian Jews, another 1,000 Jews from Germany were also murdered. They had been brought to Latvia on the first train of deportees, which arrived on 29 November 1941. Following the 29 November train, more rail transports of Jews began arriving in Riga from Germany, starting on 3 December 1941. The Jews on the first few transports were not immediately housed in the ghetto, but were left at Jungfernhof concentration camp.

In May 1942, Lange issued orders to SS-Obersturmführer Günter Tabbert to kill the surviving Jews in the Daugavpils ghetto. Only about 450 Jews survived in Daugavpils after this action, which involved killing of the sick, children, infants and hospital workers. In addition to Tabbert, the Arajs Kommando of native Latvians was responsible for a major part of these killings.

In 1942, Lange became an SS-Obersturmbannführer (lieutenant colonel) in the head office in Riga until 1945, when he became Head of Reichsgau Wartheland's SD and SiPo. He was promoted to SS-Standartenführer (colonel) in 1945.

Wannsee Conference 

Lange was called to the Wannsee Conference by Heydrich in January 1942. Lange (an SS major) was the lowest-ranking officer present and, at 31, the youngest attendee  Heydrich viewed Lange's first-hand experience in conducting the mass murder of deported Jews, in Latvia, as valuable for the conference. Instead of Lange, Heydrich could have invited either Karl Jäger or Erich Ehrlinger, who commanded the SiPo and SD in Lithuania and Belarus respectively, and were responsible for similar massacres. He chose Lange because Riga was the main deportation destination, and because Lange's doctorate and legal acumen made him seem more intellectual than the other two men. Lange's superior, Franz Walter Stahlecker, was not invited, as he was not familiar with the realities of the Jewish deportations and was not located in Riga.

(Note: One possible indication of Lange's low rank may perhaps be evident in Ian Kershaw's Hitler 1936-1945 Nemesis, where the SS major twice is mistakenly referred to as Dr. "Otto" Lange.)

Disappearance 
Early in 1945 Lange was appointed head of the SD and the SS in Poznań, Warthegau. Soon after he reached the city, Posen was surrounded by the Soviet Red Army and was declared a fortified city (Festung). Lange, who could not have any doubts about his destiny as a prisoner, directed the police under his command with fanaticism. He was wounded during the Battle of Poznań and the siege by Soviet forces and was promoted SS-Standartenführer on 30 January 1945. At Hitler's behest, on 6 February 1945 he received the German Cross in gold. Lange may have died or committed suicide when the Red Army seized Poznań on 23 February 1945 after a last-ditch defence of the city by the remnants of the German garrison.

Character 
Lange was said to have been a favourite student of Reinhard Heydrich and Heinrich Himmler. He demanded unconditional obedience from his subordinates. Joseph Berman, a survivor of one of the concentration camps administered by Lange, described him as follows:
As far as Lange is concerned, he was the biggest murderer I have ever known. To write a book about him would definitely not be enough. As he is dead, it is no use talking about him. I would, however, mention that he was one of the most notorious anti-Semites in the 20th century. He hated Jews so much that he could not look at them; one never wanted to pass him either in the motor pool or anywhere else.

Lange made himself one of the most feared officials among those responsible for the Riga ghetto. He supervised the arrival of the transports, aided by SS-Obersturmbannführer Gerhard Maywald, whom historian Gertrude Schneider, a survivor of the Riga ghetto, describes as Lange's "sidekick". Lange personally shot a young man, Werner Koppel, who he felt was not opening a railway car door fast enough. Schneider described Lange's appearance:
Even though he was somewhat smaller and darker than the blond, blue-eyed Maywald, he looked very handsome in his fur-collared uniform coat and seemed every inch an officer and a gentleman. It never occurred to the newcomers to suspect such a man of being a murderer.

SS career 
Untersturmführer, 6 July 1938
Sturmführer, 9 November 1938
Hauptsturmführer, 20 April 1940
Sturmbannführer, 20 April 1941
Obersturmbannführer, 9 November 1943
Standartenführer, 30 January 1945
Decorations:
German Gross in Gold
Iron Cross 2nd Class 1939
SA-Sports Badge in Bronze
DRL-Sports Badge in Bronze

See also
List of people who disappeared mysteriously: 1910–1990

Notes

References 

 
 
  Klein, Peter. Dr. Rudolf Lange als Kommandant der Sicherheitspolizei und des SD in Lettland. Aspekte seines Dienstalltags, in Wolf Kaiser (Hrsg.): Täter im Vernichtungskrieg. Der Überfall auf die Sowjetunion und der Völkermord an den Juden. Propyläen-Verlag, 2002. .

External links 
  Wannsee conference villa
  Lange biography and image

1910 births
1945 deaths
People from Weißwasser
German former Christians
Einsatzgruppen personnel
Missing in action of World War II
People from the Province of Silesia
Nazi Party officials
SS and Police Leaders
Recipients of the Gold German Cross
Holocaust perpetrators in Latvia
University of Jena alumni
Sturmabteilung personnel
Gestapo personnel
Riga Ghetto
SS-Standartenführer
Lawyers in the Nazi Party
German military personnel killed in World War II